Matteo II Visconti ( – Saronno, 29 September 1355) was co-ruler of Milan together with his brothers Galeazzo II and Bernabò.

Biography
He was the eldest son of Stefano Visconti and Valentina Doria. In 1342 he married Egidiola di Filippino of Gonzaga.

His uncle Luchino Visconti exiled him to Montferrat in 1346, but in 1350 returned to Milan. As co-ruler of the domain after the death of his uncle Giovanni Visconti (1354), Matteo was given Lodi, Piacenza, Parma and Bologna.

He died after a dinner in which, according to his mother and others, he had been poisoned by his brothers. His daughter Caterina was married to Ugolino Gonzaga of Mantua.

Ancestry

Sources

1319 births
1355 deaths
Matteo II Visconti
Matteo II Visconti
Assassinated Italian people
14th-century Italian nobility